Tang Ashkan is a village in Rudbar Rural District, Ruydar District, Khamir County, Hormozgan Province, Iran. At the 2006 census, its population was 43, in 10 families.

References 

Populated places in Khamir County